The 1994–95 Anglo-Italian Cup was the seventh Anglo-Italian Cup competition. The European football competition was played between eight clubs from England and eight clubs from Italy. English side Notts County lifted the trophy after beating Italian side Ascoli 2–1.

Group stage

Group A matches

Group A table

Group B matches

Group B table

Semi-finals
 English semi-final

 Italian semi-final

Ascoli won on away goal rule

Final

References

Anglo-Italian Cup
Anglo-Italian Cup
Anglo-Italian Cup